Attlebridge railway station is a closed station in Norfolk, England. It served the small village of Attlebridge. It was constructed by the Midland and Great Northern Joint Railway in the 1880s on the line between Melton Constable and Norwich City.

The line closed to passengers in 1959. The former station site, on Station Road, is now a B&B, caravan site and furniture joinery.

History

Opened by the Lynn and Fakenham Railway, it became a Midland and Great Northern Joint Railway station. During the Grouping of 1923 it converted to a joint operation of the London, Midland and Scottish Railway and the London and North Eastern Railway with the latter taking sole operation in 1936.

The station then passed on to the Eastern Region of British Railways on nationalisation in 1948, and was closed by the British Transport Commission.

The route of the former railway line is now part of the Marriott's Way leisure trail.

See also 
 List of closed railway stations in Norfolk

References

 
 
 
 Station on navigable O.S. map

External links
 Attlebridge station on navigable 1946 O. S. map

Disused railway stations in Norfolk
Former Midland and Great Northern Joint Railway stations
Railway stations in Great Britain opened in 1882
Railway stations in Great Britain closed in 1959